Tanyrhynchini is a weevil tribe in the subfamily Entiminae.

Genera 
Afroleptops – Alloleptops – Aporimus – Brachyleptops – Brachytrachelus – Eremnus – Meteremnus – Neseremnus – Orimus – Porophorus – Rhypastus – Tanyrhynchus

References 

 Schönherr, C.J. 1826: Curculionidum dispositio methodica cum generum characteribus, descriptionibus atque observationibus variis seu Prodromus ad Synonymiae Insectorum, partem IV. Fleischer, Lipsiae: X + 338 pp.
 Alonso-Zarazaga, M.A.; Lyal, C.H.C. 1999: A world catalogue of families and genera of Curculionoidea (Insecta: Coleoptera) (excepting Scolytidae and Platypodidae). Entomopraxis, Barcelona.

External links 

 
 imperialis.inhs.illinois.edu

Entiminae
Beetle tribes